Chris or Christopher Brady may refer to:

Christopher Brady, American medalist in swimming for United States at the 2011 Pan American Games
Chris Brady (basketball) (born 1995), Puerto Rican-American center
Chris Brady (soccer) (born 2004), American goalkeeper

See also
Chris Brody (disambiguation)